, stylized as KANE<O, also referred to as , was a Japanese video game publisher founded in Suginami, Tokyo, Japan, by Hiroshi Kaneko. It published a number of games both under its brand and other companies, such as Air Buster, Nexzr, Shogun Warriors, DJ Boy, Guts'n, and the Gals Panic series.

The last game released by the company was Gals Panic S3 for the arcade in 2002.

History
The company began business as developer, manufacturer, vendor, trader of electronic machines, and manufacturing medical equipment.

In 1982, it began its video game business as a developer of Taito Corporation's video games.

In 1990, Kaneko began to make its own video game under the KANEKO brand.

In Summer 1994, Kaneko closed its US branch and cancelled game projects such as Fido Dido and Socks the Cat Rocks the Hill.

In April 2000, Kaneko went through financial restructuring, and exited video game business except for maintenance department. The company was moved to Shibuya, Tokyo.

On July 25, 2001, Kaneko filed a lawsuit against Hitachi Software Engineering over the Super Kaneko NOVA System arcade board, and demanded 1.52 billion yen for damages.

On August 12, 2004, Kaneko filed for bankruptcy. However, the company's founder, Hiroshi Kaneko, vowed to continue.

In 2006, a civil lawsuit threatened to officially close the company.  the fate of the company is unknown, though assumed no longer existent.

List of games

Arcade
Air Buster (1990)
B.Rap Boys (1992)
Blood Warrior (1994)
Boggy '84 (1983)
Bonk's Adventure (1994, arcade version PC Genjin in Japan and B.C. Kid in Europe)
Cyvern: The Dragon Weapons (1998)
DJ Boy (1989, licensed by Sammy in US, Sega in Japan)
Dr. Topple's Adventure (1987, co-developed by Taito)
Explosive Breaker (1992, Bakuretsu Breaker in Japan)
Fighting Roller (1983, published and distributed by Williams as Roller Aces in the US)
Fly Boy (1982, published and distributed by Atari, Inc. as Fast Freddie in the US)
Gals Panic (1990 - Overseas, including US; published by Taito in Japan, licensed by Inter in Korea)
Gals Panic II (1993)
Gals Panic 3 (1995)
Gals Panic 4 (1996)
Gals Panic S Extra Edition (1997)
Gals Panic S2 (1999)
Gals Panic S3 (2002, Japan-exclusive)
Go Go Mr. Yamaguchi (1985, licensed by Taito)
Great 1000 Miles Rally (1994)
Great 1000 Miles Rally 2 (1995)
Guts'n (2000, developed by Kouyousha)
Heavy Unit (1988)
Jan Jan Paradise (1996, developed by Electro Design)
Jan Jan Paradise 2 (1997, developed by Electro Design)
Jump Coaster (1983)
Lady Master Of Kung Fu (1985, published by Taito)
Kabuki Z (1988, published by Taito)
Kageki (1988, published and distributed by Romstar in the US)
Prebillian (1986, co-developed by Taito)
Samurai Nipponichi (1985, published and distributed by Magic Electronics as Samurai in the US)
Red Clash (1981, distributed by Tecmo)
Tel Jan (developed by Electro Design)
The Berlin Wall (1991)
The Kung-Fu Master Jackie Chan (1995)
Magical Crystals
Panic Street
 (1998, developed by Kouyousha)
Sengeki Striker (1997, co-developed by Warashi)
Shogun Warriors (1992)
Super Qix (published and distributed by Romstar in the US, co-developed by Taito)
VS Block Breaker (Saru Kani Hamu Zou in Japan)
Vs. Gong Fight / Ring Fighter (1984)
Vs. Hot Smash (1987, co-developed by Taito)
VS Mahjong Otomeryouran (developed by Electro Design)

Game Boy
 (Game Boy version of the MSX game by Nippon Columbia)

MSX
Boggy '84 (1984) (developed by Nippon Columbia)
Jump Coaster (1984) (developed by Nippon Columbia)

NEC PC-9801
GalPani (1995) (developed by Creo I)
GalPani II (1996) (developed by Mycom)

PC-Engine/TurboGrafx-16
Air Buster (1990, developed by Inter State, published by Hudson Soft as Aero Blasters)
Heavy Unit (1989, developed by Inter State, published by Taito)
Nexzr (1992, developed by Inter State and published by Naxat-Soft, followed up by an expanded re-release in 1993 as Summer Carnival '93: Nexzr Special)
Star Parodier (1992, developed by Inter State, published by Hudson Soft)
Super Star Soldier (1990, developed by Inter State, published by Hudson Soft)

PlayStation
Hiza no Ue no Partner: Kitty on Your Lap (1998)
Silhouette Stories (1996)
Zen-Nihon GT Senshuken Kai (1996)
Zen-Nihon GT Senshuken Max-Rev (1997)

Sega Game Gear
Berlin No Kabe (1991) (developed by Inter-State)

Sega Genesis
Air Buster (1991, a.k.a. Aero Blasters in Japan, developed by Inter State)
Chester Cheetah: Too Cool to Fool (1993, developed by System Vision) 
Chester Cheetah: Wild Wild Quest (1993, developed by Kaneko USA)
Deadly Athlete (known outside Japan as Power Moves for the Super NES and Deadly Moves for the Sega Genesis)
DJ Boy (1990, developed by Inter State)
Heavy Unit: MD Special (1991, developed by Funari and published by Toho)
Kageki: Fists Of Steel (1991, developed by Sage's Creation)
Wani Wani World (1992, developed by Inter State)

Sega Saturn
Gals Panic SS (1996)

Sharp X68000
Hishouzame / Flying Shark (1991)
Kyukyoku Tiger / Twin Cobra (1993)

Super Nintendo Entertainment System
Chester Cheetah: Too Cool to Fool (1992, developed by System Vision) 
Chester Cheetah: Wild Wild Quest (1994, developed by Kaneko USA)
Power Athlete (known outside Japan as Power Moves for the Super NES and Deadly Moves for the Sega Genesis)
Zen-Nihon GT Senshuken: Hyper Battle Game (1995) (co-developed by C.P. Brain and published by Banpresto)

Unreleased games
Air Buster (1994) (Sharp X68000)
Asuka 120% Burning Fest. Limited (1998) (Arcade) (developed by Fill-In-Cafe)
Battle Smash (1992) (Sega Genesis)
Bonk's Adventure AC Version (PC-Engine)
DOX-Q (1990) (Arcade)
Fido Dido (1994) (Super NES/Sega Genesis) (developed by Tweeny Weeny Games)
Gals Panic 3D (1997) (Arcade)
Gals Panic II (1994) (Super NES)
Jump Kun (1983) (Arcade)
Pack'n Bang Bang (1994) (Arcade)
Poco Secret Flower (2000) (Arcade) (developed by CAVE)
Rainbow Chips (1991) (Game Boy) (developed by Inter-State)
Same! Same! Same! / Fire Shark in overseas (1994) (Sharp X68000)
Socks the Cat Rocks the Hill (1993) (Super NES/Sega Genesis) (developed by Realtime Associates)
Speed Dive (1997) (Arcade)
Super Gals Panic (1994?) (Sega CD)
Tatsujin / Truxton (1994) (Sharp X68000)
Tenkū Retsuden Musashi (1992) (Sega Genesis) (unreleased port of Kabuki Z)
The Berlin Wall (1991) (Sega Genesis, rumored that it got reskinned to Wani Wani World)
The Soda Kids (1994)
Yuta Buta Man-P (1999) (Arcade) (developed by CAVE)

References

External links
Former KANEKO page
Kaneko Co. Ltd. Website 
Kaneko AX System arcade hardware (16-bit) at UVList
Kaneko AX System at coinop.org
Kaneko Gals Panic Arcade at UVList
Kaneko Super Nova System at Arcade Otaku wiki
Kaneko Super Nova System at System16
Super Kaneko Nova System at UVList
Super Kaneko NOVA System at coinop.org

Amusement companies of Japan
Defunct video game companies of Japan
Video game development companies
Video game publishers